MEP may refer to:

Organisations and politics 
 Mahajana Eksath Peramuna, a political party in Sri Lanka
 Mahajana Eksath Peramuna (1956), a former political alliance in Sri Lanka
 Maison européenne de la photographie, a photography centre in Paris
 Massachusetts Environmental Police
 Member of the European Parliament
 Model European Parliament, a simulation for students
 Ministry of Environmental Protection (disambiguation)
 Hope for Portugal Movement, a political party
 Mission Essential (formerly Mission Essential Personnel), an American defense contractor
 Paris Foreign Missions Society, a Catholic organization
 People's Electoral Movement (Aruba), a political party
 People's Electoral Movement (Venezuela), a political party

Industry and technology 
 Hollings Manufacturing Extension Partnership, an American NIST program
 Mean effective pressure, of internal combustion engines
 Mechanical, electrical, and plumbing, in building design
 Media-embedded processor (MeP), by Toshiba
 Message exchange pattern, a communications protocol concept
 Multi-engine piston, a pilot's rating class
 2-C-Methylerythritol 4-phosphate

Science 
 Mars Exploration Program, NASA
 Maximal expiratory pressure
 Megakaryocyte–erythroid progenitor cell
 Melanophlogite, a silicate mineral
 Motor evoked potentials, in the nervous system

Other uses 
 Meopham railway station (station code: MEP), in England
 Mersing Airport (IATA airport code: MEP), an airport in Malaysia
 Miriwoong language (ISO 639 code: mep), an Australian language
 Mogens E. Pedersen, Danish Journalist nicknamed MEP